"I Bet My Life" is a song by American pop rock band Imagine Dragons. The track, written by band members Ben McKee, Daniel Platzman, Dan Reynolds and Wayne Sermon, was released as the lead single from their second studio album Smoke + Mirrors on October 27, 2014. The band's network debut performing the track occurred at the American Music Awards (2014), where they received the award for Favorite Alternative Artist.

Composition

Themes
Lead singer Dan Reynolds has stated that the song is about his relationship with his parents and explained that while "at times it's been strained and difficult... in the end, 'I Bet My Life' celebrates the bond that we still hold on to."

Music video
On December 12, 2014, Imagine Dragons released the official music video for "I Bet My Life".  The video was directed by Jodeb and features actors Dane DeHaan and Alex Neustaedter. Footage from the video featured in advertising by American automobile manufacturer Jeep at the American Music Awards, prior to the release of the video.

Synopsis
The beginning and end of the video take place at the Salt River in Arizona. A car is shown driving to the river. The cast are the members of Imagine Dragons, and their relatives and friends. Somewhere else at the river, a boy in a shirt (DeHaan) and a boy in overalls (Neustaedter) are fighting at the waterbed. While walking away, Neustaedter eventually pushes DeHaan into the river, and it is implied that DeHaan swims away, while the former stares in shock. DeHaan is pulled towards a dam, in which he is sucked in. He lands in a house, and looks out the window and finds everything underwater. He finds a bed and goes to sleep. The next morning, DeHaan finds himself in a sailboat, and takes control of it. He tries unsuccessfully to avoid a waterfall, but ends up flying over the land in the boat when he goes over the waterfall. While looking over the boat, he decides to flip it over. He falls into a city, and a crowd is shown carrying him. They toss and turn him, until he realizes it was a vision and he was knocked unconscious in the dam. He is pulled back up to the surface by Neustaedter, and survives. The last shot of the video zooms out from the point where DeHaan is picked up, and the video ends.

Reception
Carolyn Menyes of Music Times called the song "Another [Imagine Dragons] strong armed rolling anthem." James Grebey of www.spin.com called it "Bombastic" and USA Today named it "Song of the week" during October 27-November 4.

Track listing

Remixes
Bastille, Alex Adair, Lost Kings, Imagine Dragons, and Riot Games have all released remixes.

Personnel

Imagine Dragons
Dan Reynolds – lead vocals, songwriting, production
Wayne Sermon – guitar, songwriting, production
Ben McKee – bass guitar, songwriting, production
Daniel Platzman – drums, percussion, songwriting, production

Charts

Weekly charts

Year-end charts

Certifications

Accolades

Release history

References

External links

 Imagine Dragons official website

2014 singles
2014 songs
Imagine Dragons songs
Kidinakorner singles
Interscope Records singles
Universal Music Group singles
Songs written by Wayne Sermon
Songs written by Dan Reynolds (musician)
Songs written by Daniel Platzman
Songs written by Ben McKee
American folk rock songs
Songs about parenthood